Lithium tetrakis(pentafluorophenyl)borate is  the lithium salt of the weakly coordinating anion (B(C6F5)4)−.  Because of its weakly coordinating abilities, lithium tetrakis(pentafluorophenyl)borate makes it commercially valuable in the salt form in the catalyst composition for olefin polymerization reactions and in electrochemistry. It is a water-soluble compound. Its anion is closely related to the non-coordinating anion known as BARF. The tetrakis(pentafluorophenyl)borates have the advantage of operating on a one-to-one stoichiometric basis with Group IV transition metal polyolefin catalysts, unlike methylaluminoxane (MAO) which may be used in large excess.

Structure and properties
The anion is tetrahedral with B-C bond lengths of approximately 1.65 Angstroms. The salt has only been obtained as the etherate, and the crystallography confirms that four ether (OEt2) molecules are bound to the lithium cation, with Li-O bond lengths of approximately 1.95 Å.  The [Li(OEt2)4]+ complex is tetrahedral.

Preparation
The salt was first produced in studies on tris(pentafluorophenyl)boron, a well known Lewis acidic compound.  Combining equimolar ether solutions of pentafluorophenyllithium and tris(pentafluorophenyl)boron gives the lithium salt of tetrakis(pentafluorophenyl)borate, which precipitates the etherate as a white solid:

(C6F5)3B + Li(C6F5)  → [Li(OEt2)3][B(C6F5)4]

Since its discovery, many revised syntheses have been described.

Reactions
Lithium tetrakis(pentafluorophenyl)borate is primarily used to prepare cationic transition metal complexes:
LiB(C6F5)4)  +  MLnCl  →   LiCl  +  [MLn]B(C6F5)4

LiB(C6F5)4 is converted to the trityl reagent [Ph3C][B(C6F5)4], which is useful activator of Lewis-acid catalysts.

Safety
Lithium tetrakis(pentafluorophenyl)borate will deflagrate on melting (ca 265 C) giving thick black smoke, even under nitrogen. The mechanism is unknown. Metal tetrakis(pentafluorophenyl)borates of K and Na decompose vigorously as well.

See also
 Tetraphenylborate

References

Lithium salts
Organoboron compounds
Pentafluorophenyl compounds